Patos is a town and a municipality in the County of Fier, Albania. The municipality was formed at the 2015 local government reform by the merger of the former municipalities Patos, Ruzhdie and Zharrëz, that became municipal units. The seat of the municipality is the town Patos. The total population is 22,959 (2011 census), in a total area of 82.59 km2. The population of the former municipality at the 2011 census was 15,397. It is the center of the oil industry in Albania, and is 7 kilometers southeast from the city of Fier.

History
Patos is a very old city. It was a city for oil in the modern day and during King of Albania era and during the People's Socialist Republic of Albania era. The city was also for the works to sleep in and investors. The city is one of the biggest offshore oil field in the Balkans and in Europe. The Patos-Marinza Oil Field was discovered in 1928. It Produces about 11,854 barrels everyday more than other oil fields. It has a reserve of 2 billion barrels. This developed Patos in to an oil hub for Europe and the world.

Economy

The economy of Patos is mainly based on oil companies such as Bankers Petroleum, and Albpetrol. Patos is on the Patos-Marinza Oil Field which one of the biggest offshore oil fields. There has been an estimate of 1.500 million barrels underground and there is a proven reserve of 2 billion barrels of oil. The Trans Adriatic Pipeline will cross Patos therefore there will be more business in the area and a higher economy impact. The economy is also heavily based on agriculture with a lot of arable land. The main crops are Olives in the hills and tomatoes, cucumber, and more are produced in Patos. Patos lies in the region of Myzeqe. A region in which there is arable land for crops and this also lies on many other cities such as Lushnjë, Fier, Roskovec, and many other small villages are in this region. Patos is also home to the headquarters of Albpetrol.

Oil Producers in the Region
Albpetrol
Taçi Oil
Bankers Petroleum
Royal Dutch Shell
Trans Adriatic Pipeline

Geography
The landscape of Patos is half hills and mountains and plains. The plains are arable land for agriculture and oil fields. The plains are located north from Patos. the hills and mountain ranges have olive oil farms. The hills and mountains are located south from Patos.

Climate
The climate in Patos is very hot in the summer time with hot Mediterranean climate and very cold winters.

Subdivisions
Patos, Ruzhdie, Zharrëz

Transportation

Bus
There are buses in the city to take you to other places around Albania.

Train
There is no railway going for Patos the nearest train station is Fier and Ballsh.

Highways
The only major road that is near Patos is the SH73 on the outskirts of the city. The SH73 starts at Fier and ends in Poshnje.

Sports

The main professional team representing the city is football team Klubi Sportiv Albpetrol Patos. Its sponsor and owner is Albpetrol, and they play at the Alush Noga Stadium, which has a capacity of 4,000 spectators. The stadium was renovated in 2013 and 2016. They currently compete in the second tier and have one European appearance; against FC Balzers of Liechtenstein in the 1993–94 European Cup Winners' Cup, where they suffered a 3-1 away loss on and a draw at home on the return leg.

References 

Municipalities in Fier County
 
Administrative units of Patos (municipality)
Towns in Albania